88 athletes (70 men and 18 women) from Italy competed at the 1992 Summer Paralympics in Barcelona, Spain.

Medalists

See also
Italy at the Paralympics
Italy at the 1992 Summer Olympics

References 

Nations at the 1992 Summer Paralympics
1992
Summer Paralympics